Chromulina is a genus of golden algae in the family Chromulinaceae.

References

External links 
 
 Chromulina at AlgaeBase
 Chromulina at NCBI

Chrysophyceae
Heterokont genera
Algae genera